Carol Monaghan (born 2 August 1972) is a Scottish National Party (SNP) politician who was elected Member of Parliament (MP) for Glasgow North West in the general election in May 2015. She is the SNP Education spokesperson in the House of Commons.

Education 
Monaghan studied at Strathclyde University, graduating with a BSc (Hons) in Laser Physics and Optoelectronics in 1993.

Career 
Monaghan had formerly been a physics teacher at Glasgow west end independent school The Glasgow Academy, and head of science at Hyndland Secondary School but left the post to concentrate on campaigning before the 2015 general election.

Following the 2017 general election, Monaghan was appointed the SNP's Westminster Spokesperson for Education, Armed Forces and Veterans. Monaghan has campaigned for an armed forces representative body on a statutory footing.

Monaghan has campaigned on the issue of research, treatment and attitudes towards myalgic encephalomyelitis (ME), leading two Westminster Hall debates in 2018, and a full debate in the House of Commons in 2019.

Personal life 
Monaghan is married to Glasgow City SNP councillor and physics teacher Feargal Dalton, and they have two daughters and a son from a previous partner. She is a practising Roman Catholic.

References

External links
Profile on SNP website
 

1972 births
Living people
Alumni of the University of Strathclyde
Female members of the Parliament of the United Kingdom for Scottish constituencies
Members of the Parliament of the United Kingdom for Glasgow constituencies
Politicians from Glasgow
Scottish National Party MPs
Scottish Roman Catholics
Scottish schoolteachers
UK MPs 2015–2017
UK MPs 2017–2019
UK MPs 2019–present
21st-century Scottish women politicians
21st-century Scottish politicians